Kalyani University Experimental High School or KUEHS is a government sponsored high school, located in the township of Kalyani in the district of Nadia of state West Bengal in India.

History 

Kalyani University Experimental High School started her journey in 1965 as an English medium K.G. school housed in two sheds and eight quarters. The school was under the University of Kalyani because at that time there was dart of schools especially English Medium one at kalyani. That time the K.G. school has grown into a full-fledged Higher Secondary School. In 1970 the West Bengal Board of Secondary Education recognized the institution as XI class High School with two streams viz. Science & Humanities. From 1965 to 1986 the school had been under the University of Kalyani. Later in 1987 the Government of West Bengal had been taken over all the fiscal liabilities and the school had become a Govt. Sponsored one. In 1990 the West Bengal Council of Higher Secondary Education recognized the institution as an H.S. School. In the last five decades the school has occupied a position of excellence in the district as well as the state.

References

High schools and secondary schools in West Bengal
Schools in Nadia district
Kalyani, West Bengal
Educational institutions established in 1965
1965 establishments in West Bengal